Paul Jacob Christopher Hoffmann (born 14 January 1970), is an Australian cricketer who has played for the cricket teams of Scotland. He is a right-handed batsman and right-arm medium-fast bowler.

Early life 
Hoffmann was born on 14 January 1970 in Rockhampton, Queensland, Australia.

Career
As a youngster, Hoffmann competed as a woodchopper, following in his father's footsteps. However at the age of 12, while chopping barefoot, he slipped and removed the tip of his left big toe. Following this horrific event Paul never regained his technique and turned to cricket to fill the void.

After playing for the Australian Country team against the West Indies in 1993 and for Manly in Sydney, Hoffmann emigrated to Scotland in 1997, first playing for the Uddingston club as an overseas professional. He liked it so much that he stayed on and played as an amateur. Hoffmann is the leading wicket taker in the history of the Scottish National League, with 282 wickets.

Hoffmann qualified by residence to play for Scotland in 2001, making his début in a match against an England Amateur team on 14 August 2001, taking five wickets. He went on to play for Scotland on 119 occasions. This includes fifteen One Day Internationals, his first match of that type coming against Pakistan in June 2006. Taking 3 for 22 off his 10 overs, including Salman Butt and Younis Khan.

Hoffmann played for Scotland in their winning 2005 ICC Trophy campaign and was the top wicket-taker in the tournament with 17 wickets. This included taking 6 wickets for 12 runs against Oman, a record for Scotland in ICC Trophy competition. In the 2007 World Cricket League tournament in Kenya he bowled Scotland to victory over Netherlands with a heroic last over taking two wickets in three balls for 0 runs, with a run out accounting for the 2nd wicket of the three that fell in the over.

A hard-hitting batsman, Hoffmann holds the record for the fastest century in Scottish National League cricket history, smashing 100 off 35 balls for his club Uddingston in May 2005. He was an important member of the Scottish Saltires cricket team and was part of their squad for the Cricket World Cup in March 2007.

Hoffmann retired from International cricket in August 2007, returning typically miserly figures of 9 overs for 43 in his final game against India at Glasgow. He now lives in Uddingston with his family and Chopper, his beloved Doberman.

References

External links
Cricket Online Profile
Uddingston Cricket Club
Cricinfo Profile

1970 births
Living people
Sportspeople from Rockhampton
Australian cricketers
Scottish cricketers
Scotland One Day International cricketers
Cricketers from Queensland
Australian emigrants to Scotland